Suvisaaristo (Finnish) or Sommaröarna (Swedish) is a maritime district in Espoo, Finland, districts number 451 and 452, and an archipelago in the Gulf of Finland, directly in front of a peninsula in Soukka, in the southwestern corner of Espoo.

Inhabitants of Suvisaaristo have always been an active people, and there are nine registered communities on the islands, the most numerous of which are the yacht club ESF, the canoe club Canoa, the youth club SViE, the local free fire brigade, and the district inhabitant community Sommarö Society, whose work resulted in Suvisaaristo getting its own water cooperative in 1999, after the city of Espoo refused to pay the costs of a water network, because of the expenses resulting from such a loosely populated district. The network was implemented with a new technology, a pressurised sewer, which is more ecological than the traditional solution.

The Uusimaa region council chose Suvisaaristo as the Uusimaa Village of the Year in 2007.

The YTV regional bus line 145 goes to the end of Suvisaaristontie one or two times every hour. A local shop can be found a hundred metres after the Suvisaaristo bridge on the right-hand side, and on the way in Skatan there is a gas station for boaters in summertime.

In summertime, there are Espoo tour boats between Suvisaaristo and the continental strait of Suinonsalmi (Swedish Svinösund).

History
Originally, Suvisaaristo consisted of three farms, Stor-Svinö, Lill-Svinö and Moisö. At times in history, they have been abandoned because of poverty or uncertain times, but at times they have been relatively wealthy. In the 1571 census, both Svinö farms had six cows and two horses each. Moisö had five cows, one calf and one horse. These animals outnumbered any of those of the peasants in Matinkylä. An explanation for the wealth is that the Suvisaaristo farms were traditionally allowed to pay their taxes in seal fat and their land rent to the King's manor in salted herring.

The peasants in the islands bought their farms as their own in 1825, and in the early 1920s the farms were combined as one. The islands, without a bridge at that point, had about ten fishing houses, and for a certain reason, during prohibition they could afford to buy the houses as their own and build spacious villas to rent to Helsinkians. In the 1920s, the islands were accessed with island steam boats and motorised passenger boats. One steam ship, the SS Sommaröarna, was registered to the islands, but it was soon sold away as unprofitable. In the 1930s, the islands got electricity and telephone connections, and in 1936, bridges were built to Svinö and Ramsö, which started regular bus traffic. The bridges were renewed and widened to two lanes in 1976.

Income
The main sources of income on the islands have traditionally been island hobbies, fishing, hunting, and small-scale farming, and the islands hosted many well-reputed carpenters, rock sculptors and axe workers. The host of Stor-Svinö in the 1880s was also a boat captain. Previously, the farms had on occasion a duty to act as pilots, and were obliged to host a few waterway markers. In the 1950s, Suvisaaristo had six boat yards, three of which built boats, and all of which serviced and repaired boats and engines. On the islands that were still without a bridge at that point, six families had fishing as their main source of income, and on the islands that had bridges, three families, all of which depended upon service of boats. The last professional fisher retired in the 1980s, and there are still two boat yards in operation, one of which is owned by a native archipelagian. In the premises of one boat yard was a plastic factory in the 1950s through the 1970s. The last horse of Moisö, Frelinde, was put to pastures beyond in 1952, and the cows, Utta and Popsi, received a grace period of 5 to 10 years. Until the 1960s, there was a rental farmer in the Lill-Svinö farm house, who kept a couple of cows. A few of the axe workers also had had their own horse to help in the transport. For a few years, the Svinö farm kept sheep in summertime as shareowner activity, and Moisö had an active henhouse until the end of the 1970s. At their most, there were three shops, and the islands got their own post office in the 1970s, but it was closed down after a few years, when the post was in troubled times.

Population, buildings and infrastructure
In the 1950s, the all-year population of Suvisaaristo numbered fifty households, and except for two people, the entire population was native Swedish-speaking. Today, Suvisaaristo is home to three hundred households (445 people in 1995), of which less than 40% are native Swedish-speaking. The buildings have, because of a long-time ban on new construction (in the 1970s, 1980s and 1990s, because of incomplete urban planning) remained on a reasonable scale, although for example there are only a couple of the buildings built in the 19th century left, including the Pentala fishing stead's shore storage house, the Munkholmen villa and the Moisö cow house. In the 1990s, prices of lots climbed very high, and new buildings are today also similarly expensive. On the main islands, there is scarcely any summer population any more, but on the outer islands, there are a few summer cabins still in use. In 2008, only one family still lives all year round on an island without a road connection.

Islands

Islands with a road connection
 Bergö
 Furuholm
 Moisö
 Ramsö
 Skataholmen
 Svartholm
 Suino (Svinö)

Other islands
The archipelago also includes about forty islands without a road connection, for example Alskär.

References

External links
 Uudenmaan liitto news: Suvisaaristo is the Uusimaa Village of the Year 2007

Districts of Espoo
Islands of Espoo